Maksim Kazlovich (born 29 November 1990) is a retired Belarusian professional footballer. He retired in early 2012 due to medical reasons.

External links

1990 births
Living people
Belarusian footballers
FC Shakhtyor Soligorsk players
FC Rechitsa-2014 players
Association football defenders